Corymbia dichromophloia, commonly known as the small-fruited bloodwood, variably-barked bloodwood or gum-topped bloodwood, is a species of tree that is endemic to northern Australia. It has smooth white bark sometimes with flaky bark on the trunk, lance-shaped adult leaves, flower buds usually in groups of seven, creamy white flowers and urn-shaped fruit.

Description
It has smooth white, sometimes powdery bark, sometimes with thin, unshed orange and brownish flakes on the trunk and upper branches. Flowering occurs between February and May and the flowers are creamy white. The seeds are reddish brown and boat-shaped with a wing on the end.

Taxonomy and naming
This eucalypt was first formally described in 1859 by Ferdinand von Mueller who gave it the name Eucalyptus dichromophloia and published the description in Journal of the Proceedings of the Linnean Society, Botany. In 1995 Ken Hill and Lawrie Johnson changed the name to Corymbia dichromophloia.

There is debate about the status of this species and differing taxonomies have been proposed. Corymbia capricornia, C. drysdalensis and C. rubens have been described, but even then there is hybridisation and intergradation between these and other species of Corymbia.

Distribution and habitat
Corymbia dichromophloia grows in woodland on hills, ridges, plains and near river banks on red or yellow sandy soils over granite or sandstone. It is found in Western Australia, including in the Kimberley region and Wunaamin Miliwundi Ranges, in the Top End and south to Katherine in the Northern Territory, and near Mount Isa, Cloncurry and Normanton in Queensland.

See also
 List of Corymbia species

References

dichromophloia
Myrtales of Australia
Rosids of Western Australia
Flora of the Northern Territory
Flora of Queensland
Plants described in 1859
Taxa named by Ferdinand von Mueller